Something for Everybody is an album released by Baz Luhrmann in 1998. It contains new ambient versions (either newly recorded or remixed) of music from his films and plays, including hits from William Shakespeare's Romeo + Juliet, Strictly Ballroom and La bohème. The most popular single from the album is the spoken word song "Everybody's Free (To Wear Sunscreen)".

Critical reception
Stephen Thomas Erlewine of AllMusic said of the album: "It's an unusual step to release a remix album based on a film director's work, but the endeavor actually works. A few songs sound a little uneasy, but many of the tracks have a dark, haunting beauty that makes Something for Everybody a fascinating listen."

Track listing
"Bazmark Fanfare" – 0:15
"Young Hearts Run Free" (The Overture Mix) featuring Kym Mazelle – 5:13
"Lovefool" (Snooper version) featuring Snooper – 3:08
"Perhaps, Perhaps, Perhaps" featuring Doris Day – 2:33
"Time After Time (The S.F.E. version) featuring Tara Morice – 3:58
"Che Gelida Manina (Your Tiny Hand Is Frozen)" featuring David Hobson and the Australian Opera and Ballet Orchestra – 2:45
"When Doves Cry" (extended mix) featuring Quindon Tarver – 4:59
"Love Is in the Air" (Fran Mix) featuring John Paul Young – 4:30
"Nutbod" (Houseboats of Kashmir Mix) featuring Christine Anu and Royce Doherty – 4:03
"Happy Feet" (High Heels Mix) featuring Jack Hylton and His Orchestra – 2:20
"Angel" (7 inch Mix) featuring Gavin Friday – 4:10
"Os Quindos de Yaya" featuring Stanley Black – 1:59
"Aquarius/Let the Sunshine In" featuring Helena Paparizou – 4:54
"Everybody's Free (To Wear Sunscreen)" featuring Quindon Tarver – 7:10
"I'm Losing You" featuring Lani – 2:56
"Now Until the Break of Day" (single version) featuring Christine Anu, David Hobson and Royce Doherty – 4:06
"Jupiter" (from The Planets) (edit) featuring The London Symphony Orchestra – 4:38

Charts

Release history

References

1998 debut albums
EMI Records albums